The women's 70 kilograms (middleweight) competition at the 2014 Asian Games in Incheon was held on 21 September 2014 at the Dowon Gymnasium.

Kim Seong-yeon of South Korea won the gold medal.

Schedule
All times are Korea Standard Time (UTC+09:00)

Results

Main bracket

Repechage

References

External links
 
 Official website

W70
Judo at the Asian Games Women's Middleweight
Asian W70